Jérôme de Bontin (born September 12, 1957) is a Franco-American businessman and football administrator.

Early life
Jérôme de Bontin was born on September 12, 1957 in Paris, France. He graduated with a B.A. in Economics from Amherst College in Massachusetts, where he attended at the same time as Albert II, Prince of Monaco.

Career
Jérôme de Bontin has 20 years of professional experience in sustainability and investment management. He is a Senior Advisor and Partner at Capricorn Investment Group, a leading mission-driven Investment management and venture capital firm with offices in Silicon Valley and New York City. He is also the Founder and President of Mékar Financial Services, an asset management and investment advisory firm.
 
Mr. de Bontin started his career in finance with Drexel Burnham Lambert in futures, options and derivatives from 1981 to 1988. He then became managing director of Rodman and Renshaw from 1988 to 1993.  In 1993 he was named CEO and President of Credit Agricole Futures, Inc. a position he held until 1997. He founded Sustainability Investments LLC. and Mékar Financial Services in 1998. Sustainability Investments LLC had a strategic partnership with Sustainable Asset Management (SAM) in Zurich until it was purchased by Robeco in 2008.

In addition to his ventures in the financial sector, de Bontin held several professional Soccer administration titles, including coaching and referee licenses in the United States. de Bontin was trustee of the United States Soccer Foundation Investment Committee from 1995 to 2019. He was on the Board of the Foundation for several years and chaired the Development Committee.  
In June 2002, de Bontin was named director of Ligue 1 side AS Monaco FC. In April 2008, he was promoted to President of the club. He became the first non-Monégasque President of the club. In March 2009, after successfully bringing a new ownership group to the Club, de Bontin  stepped down and moved back to the States.

In October 2012, de Bontin was appointed General Manager of Major League Soccer’s New York Red Bulls, following the departure of Erik Solér.[3] He led the team to its first ever title with the 2013 Supporter’Shield trophy. He resigned in April 2014.
In 2015, de Bontin joined Capricorn Investment Group as Strategic Advisor, and in March 2020, he was named a Partner and Senior Advisor, where his primary responsibilities now include sourcing investment opportunities and working with portfolio funds on strategy, marketing, and distribution.

References

1957 births
Living people
Businesspeople from Paris
Amherst College alumni
French sports executives and administrators
Major League Soccer executives
Businesspeople from Massachusetts